Kinnon Ray Tatum II (born July 19, 1975) is a former American football linebacker who played two seasons with the Carolina Panthers of the National Football League. He was drafted by the Carolina Panthers in the third round of the 1997 NFL Draft. He played college football at the University of Notre Dame and attended Douglas Byrd High School in Fayetteville, North Carolina. He was also a member of the Tampa Bay Buccaneers.

References

External links
Just Sports Stats

Living people
1977 births
Players of American football from North Carolina
American football linebackers
African-American players of American football
Notre Dame Fighting Irish football players
Carolina Panthers players
Sportspeople from Fayetteville, North Carolina
21st-century African-American sportspeople
20th-century African-American sportspeople